Grzegorz Bolesław Lato (born 8 April 1950) is a Polish former professional football player and manager who played as a winger. He was a member of Poland's golden generation of football players who rose to fame in the 1970s and early 80s. Over a decade, he represented Poland at five major tournaments starting with gold at the 1972 Summer Olympic Games in Munich and ending with a third-place finish at the 1982 FIFA World Cup in Spain. He reached the peak of his career at the 1974 World Cup, where he was the leading scorer and the only Pole to-date to have won the honor. After retiring from his playing career he had a brief stint as manager in several clubs in and out of Poland.

Lato, as a member of Democratic Left Alliance, was a Polish Senator for the Rzeszów region, between 2001 and 2005.

On 30 October 2008, he was elected president of Polish Football Association (PZPN). As president of the PZPN he oversaw the Euro 2012 tournament, which was co-hosted by Poland. He was finally succeeded by Zbigniew Boniek on 26 October 2012.

Club career

Stal Mielec
Lato was born in Malbork. He arrived at Stal Mielec as a teenager in 1966. Over the next 14 years, he led Stal from the Second Division to the top tier of Polish football and its most successful era in its history. During his time there, the club would go on to win the Ekstraklasa—the Polish First-Division—twice, in 1973 and 1976, as well as be regular participants in European competitions. This era of success culminated with their appearance at the quarter-finals of the 1975-76 UEFA Cup. He inspired the club's good form with his prolific goal scoring, amassing 111 goals in 272 appearances. He was the top scorer of the Ekstraklasa during the 1972–73 and 1974–75 seasons.

Later career
In 1980, having turned 30, Lato was finally free to leave Poland to pursue his career abroad. Despite his age, his international performances had garnered him interest. Lato ended up receiving a personal invitation from Pelé to play for the New York Cosmos. However, he ultimately decided on settling in Belgium playing for K.S.C. Lokeren, scoring 12 goals over 2 seasons. By 1982, Lato decided to move on, signing for Atlante F.C. in Mexico where he amassed 15 goals. In 1984, he played in Canada in one match in the National Soccer League. He spent the rest of the 1980s playing amateur football in Hamilton, Ontario for Polonia Hamilton—a club founded by Polish immigrants. In 1991 he decided to retire from football.

International career
Lato represented the Polish national team for 13 years during the 1970s and 80s earning a total of 100 caps. He won his first cap under legendary Poland coach Kazimierz Górski in a qualifying game for the 1972 European Championships against West-Germany. The game ended as 1–3 loss. He was able to translate his prolific domestic goal-scoring record onto the international stage, where he became renowned for his striking prowess, especially in big games.

World Cup

1974 World Cup

The highpoint of Lato's professional career came during the 1974 World Cup in West Germany. Poland had a tough first round, having been seeded in Group 4, along with Argentina and Italy as well as Haiti. Lato went on to have immediate impact. In Poland's first game against Argentina, he scored 2 goals leading Poland to a historic 3–2 win. Buoyed, Poland hammered Haiti in the next game 7–0, with Lato adding another 2 goals. Finally Poland beat Italy 2–1, to end the group-stage as undefeated winners of Group 4.

In the second round, Poland were seeded into Group B with West Germany, Sweden and Yugoslavia. Lato continued his great form as the tournament progressed. Poland defeated Sweden 1–0 and Yugoslavia 2–1, with Lato contributing the winning goals in both games. Poland's final game of the group of was against West Germany. The Germans had also defeated Sweden and Yugoslavia, tying both teams on points. Thus, the game would prove decisive in deciding who would finish Group B 1st or 2nd—the winner would go to the final, the loser would go to the third-place play-off. Poland played a strong game, often threatening the West-German goal. However, Lato was unable to score and Poland succumbed to a 1–0 defeat—their only loss of the tournament.

Poland's final game of the tournament was the third-place playoff against holders Brazil. In a tight game, Lato again proved to be the difference, scoring the only goal and leading the Polish national team to a Bronze finish. He ended the tournament as top goalscorer, having scored 7 goals.

1978 World Cup
Lato had arguably had been Poland's best player at the 1974 World Cup. However, by the time of the 1978 tournament in Argentina he was unable to replicate his great form. In the first round, Poland were seeded in Group 2 with West Germany, Mexico and Tunisia. Poland did well, winning the group by drawing 0–0 with West Germany, and winning against Tunisia and Mexico, 1–0 and 3–1 respectively. Lato, however, was only able to score one goal, albeit a decisive one against Tunisia.

In the second round, Poland found themselves in the "group of death" against Argentina and Brazil—both tournament favorites—and Peru. Lato, unfortunately, couldn't resurrect his from four years prior, only mustering a single goal against Brazil. Poland ultimately finished third place having been beaten by both the hosts Argentina and Brazil 0–2 and 1–3 respectively. Poland managed to beat Peru 1–0 but that wasn't enough to secure 2nd place in Group B and they were duly eliminated. Having played in all of Poland's 6 games, Lato ended the tournament with only 2 goals.

1982 World Cup

Lato was 32 by the time Poland qualified for the 1982 FIFA World Cup in Spain. His age was getting the better of him and he lacked the electrifying pace that defined his earlier career. Lato was still a first team player, but during Poland's 7 games at the tournament he managed only a solitary goal in Poland's 5–1 thrashing of Peru in the first round. However, several players had risen in a new generation of great Polish players, chief among them Zbigniew Boniek—who scored a hat-trick against Belgium—were able to fill the void. Despite his lack of goals Lato still contributed to the team play and played and important role. In the end, Poland reached the third-place playoff against France. They went on to win 3–2 and Lato added another Bronze World Cup medal to his collection.

Olympic Games
Lato won medals at two Summer Olympics football competitions: a gold medal at the 1972 Summer Olympics and a silver medal at the 1976 Summer Olympics.

His final game before retirement was on 17 April 1984, a friendly against Belgium. He was subbed off in the 85th and Poland lost the game 0–1. Lato amassed 45 goals and the third highest goal scoring total in Polish national team history, second only to that of Robert Lewandowski and Włodzimierz Lubański. He also had an impressive goal scoring record of 0.43 goals per game. He was the first Polish player to reach a century of caps.

Managerial career
In 1996 he graduated from the School of Coaches of the Polish Football Association. After finishing his football career, he became a coach. Initially, he coached in Canada where he became manager of North York Rockets(1988–1990). He then returned to his old club Stal Mielec (1991–1993 and 1996–1997) before coaching several other Polish clubs: Olimpia Poznań (1993–1995) and Amica Wronki (1995–1996). He had a brief stint in Greece as manager of AO Kavala (1997) before he finally returned to Poland and eventually retired from managing with Widzew Łódź (1999).

After football
Lato, as a member of Democratic Left Alliance, was a Polish Senator for the Rzeszow region, between 2001 and 2005.

In October 2008, he was elected President of the Polish FA (PZPN).
In an 2011 interview, Lato said that if Poland didn't progress to the Euro 2012 quarterfinals he would hand in his resignation from the position of President of the Polish FA. After Poland's 0–1 defeat by the Czech Republic on 16 June 2012—which officially knocked them out of Euro 2012 in the group stages—he refused to resign. He did not seek reelection and was replaced by Zbigniew Boniek, in October 2012.

Playing style
Blessed with remarkable acceleration, the talented right-winger consistently lived up to the high expectations placed upon him at the international level. Lato was not renowned as a crowd pleaser, but rather as a consistent team player. His great awareness on the pitch, coupled with his flexibility—he often played as a forward—allowed him to achieve success at the international and club levels.

Career statistics

Club

International goals
Scores and results list Poland's goal tally first, score column indicates score after each Lato goal.

Honours

Club
Stal Mielec
Polish Premier League: 1973, 1976
Polish Cup finalist: 1976

Atlante F.C.
CONCACAF Champions Cup: 1983

 Lokeren SC 
 Belgian Cup finalist: 1981

Individual
 Polish Premier League top scorer: 1973, 1975
 Piłka Nożna Player of the Year: 1977, 1981
 Sport Player of the Year: 1974, 1977

International
Poland
 Olympic gold medal: 1972
 Olympic silver medal: 1976
 FIFA World Cup – third place: 1974, 1982

Individual
 FIFA World Cup Golden Shoe: 1974
 FIFA World Cup All-Star Team: 1974
 Polish Footballer of the Year: 1977, 1981

See also
 List of footballers with 100 or more caps

References

External links

 International appearances and goals
 Profile and image of Lato

1950 births
Living people
People from Malbork
Association football midfielders
Polish footballers
K.S.C. Lokeren Oost-Vlaanderen players
Stal Mielec players
Atlante F.C. footballers
Expatriate footballers in Belgium
Expatriate footballers in Mexico
Footballers at the 1972 Summer Olympics
Footballers at the 1976 Summer Olympics
Olympic footballers of Poland
Olympic gold medalists for Poland
Olympic silver medalists for Poland
1974 FIFA World Cup players
1978 FIFA World Cup players
1982 FIFA World Cup players
Poland international footballers
Polish sportsperson-politicians
FIFA Century Club
Polish expatriate footballers
Belgian Pro League players
Members of the Senate of Poland 2001–2005
Democratic Left Alliance politicians
Ekstraklasa players
Liga MX players
Canadian National Soccer League players
Polish football managers
Amica Wronki managers
Stal Mielec managers
Widzew Łódź managers
Recipients of the Order of Polonia Restituta (1944–1989)
Olympic medalists in football
Sportspeople from Pomeranian Voivodeship
Polish expatriate sportspeople in Canada
Polish expatriate sportspeople in Belgium
Polish expatriate sportspeople in Mexico
Expatriate soccer managers in Canada
Medalists at the 1976 Summer Olympics
Medalists at the 1972 Summer Olympics
Polish expatriate football managers